Corneliszoon or Cornelisz is a Dutch patronym, meaning son of Cornelis, the Dutch form of Cornelius.

People with this patronym include:

Claes Corneliszoon Moeyaert (1592–1655), authoritative Catholic Dutch painter
Cornelis Corneliszoon van Uitgeest (1550–1600), inventor of the wind-powered sawmill
Hendrick Cornelisz. van Vliet (1611–1675), Dutch painter
Hendrick Cornelisz Vroom (1566–1640), Dutch Golden Age painter and founder of Dutch marine art or seascape painting
Jacob Cornelisz. van Neck (1564–1638), Dutch naval officer and explorer, led the second Dutch expedition to Indonesia 1598–1599
Jacob Cornelisz van Oostsanen (1470–1533), Northern Netherlandish designer of woodcuts, and painter
Jan Cornelisz Vermeyen (1500–1559), Dutch Northern Renaissance painter
Jeronimus Cornelisz (1598–1629), Frisian apothecary and Dutch East India Company (VOC) merchant
Johannes Cornelisz Verspronck (1600–1662), Dutch Golden Age portraitist
Pieter Cornelisz van Slingelandt (1640–1691), Dutch Golden Age painter
Pieter Cornelisz van Soest (1600–1620), Dutch marine artist, especially prolific in battle-pieces
Pieter Corneliszoon Hooft (1581–1647), Dutch historian, poet and playwright from the period known as the Dutch Golden Age
Pieter Corneliszoon Plockhoy (1625–1670), Dutch Mennonite and Collegiant utopist who founded a settlement near Horekill
Willem Cornelisz van Muyden (1573–1634), Dutch mariner
Willem Cornelisz Duyster (1599–1635), Dutch Golden Age painter from Amsterdam
Witte Corneliszoon de With (1599–1658), Dutch naval officer